The 2014 IIHF Women's Challenge Cup of Asia Division I was an international women's ice hockey tournament run by the International Ice Hockey Federation. The tournament took place between 26 December and 28 December 2013 in Hong Kong, China and was the first edition of the Women's Division I competition under the IIHF Challenge Cup of Asia series of tournaments. Hong Kong won the tournament after winning all three of their games and finishing first in the standings. Thailand finished in second place and Singapore finished third.

Overview
The 2014 IIHF Women's Challenge Cup of Asia Division I tournament began on 26 December in Hong Kong, China with the games played at Mega Ice. Hong Kong returned to international competition having last played in 2007 at the Hong Kong International Women's Ice Hockey Tournament while Singapore, Thailand and the United Arab Emirates all made their debut appearance in international competition.

Hong Kong won the tournament after winning all three of their round-robin games and finishing first in the standings. Thailand claimed second following their wins over Singapore and the United Arab Emirates, finishing four points ahead of third place in the standings. Singapore finished in third place following their overtime win against the United Arab Emirates. Thailand's Nuchanat Ponglerkdee finished as the tournaments top scorer with 11 points which included seven goals and four assists. Jenny Kai Chin Lee of Hong Kong finished as the tournaments leading goaltender with a save percentage of 100.00.

Standings

Fixtures
All times are local. (HKT – UTC+8)

Scoring leaders
List shows the top ten skaters sorted by points, then goals, assists, and the lower penalties in minutes.

Leading goaltenders
Only the top goaltenders, based on save percentage, who have played at least 40% of their team's minutes are included in this list.

References

External links
Tournament page at IIHF.com

IIHF Women's Challenge Cup of Asia Division I
IIHF Women's Challenge Cup of Asia Division I
IIHF Women's Challenge Cup of Asia Division I
IIHF Women's Challenge Cup of Asia
International ice hockey competitions hosted by Hong Kong